Astathes violaceipennis is a species of beetle in the family Cerambycidae. It was described by J. Thomson in 1857. It is known from China, Laos, India, Nepal, Thailand, Myanmar, and Vietnam.

References

V
Beetles described in 1857
Beetles of Asia